Lapi may refer to:

People with the surname
 Allegra Lapi (born 1985), Italian water polo player
 Eduardo Lapi (born 1964), Venezuelan politician
 Giulia Lapi (born 1985), Italian synchronized swimmer
 Laura Lapi (born 1970), Italian tennis player
 Niccolò Lapi (1667-1732), Italian painter

Places
 Lapi, Estonia
 
 Läpi, Estonia

See also
 Łapy, Poland